Verena Krebs  (born 1984 in Marburg) is a German historian who specialises in medieval European and African history. She was appointed a professor at the Historical Institute of the University of Bochum in 2017.

Research 
Krebs' first monograph, "Medieval Ethiopian Kingship, Craft, and Diplomacy with Latin Europe", received widespread attention upon its publication in 2021 and was very positively reviewed in both academic journals (including by Peter Brown and David Abulafia) and popular media (BBC History Podcast, Smithsonian Magazine, Al Jazeera China).

Education and Career 
Krebs studied at the University of Konstanz and graduated with a Master of Arts in History in 2010. In 2014, she was awarded a bi-national doctorate in Medieval History by the University of Konstanz, Germany,  and Mekelle University, Ethiopia, for her PhD research on the medieval history of Solomonic Ethiopia, citing Ethiopian historian Taddesse Tamrat as a significant influence on her research. She was a postdoctoral research fellow of the Martin Buber Society in the Humanities and Social Sciences at the Hebrew University of Jerusalem from 2014 to 2017 before being appointed to a professorship (Juniorprofessur) at the University of Bochum in 2017.

In 2021, Krebs was named a Fellow of the Royal Historical Society (FRHistS). In March 2022, she was awarded the prestigious Dan David Prize, which "recognizes outstanding scholarship that illuminates the past and seeks to anchor public discourse in a deeper understanding of history" for “overturning traditional narratives of African-European relations and cultural exchange, and painting a vivid picture of the role of art, artisans and relics in state-building and diplomacy in medieval Ethiopia”.

Krebs is spending the academic year 2022/23 as a Member of the School of Historical Studies at the Institute for Advanced Study at Princeton.

Works 
 "Medieval Ethiopian Kingship, Craft, and Diplomacy with Latin Europe", Palgrave Macmillian 2021. 
 "Windows onto the world: culture contact and western Christian art in Ethiopia, 1402–1543." PhD thesis, University of Konstanz: KOPS – The Institutional Repository of the University of Konstanz, 2014.

External links 
 Personal homepage (in English): https://www.verenakrebs.com/
 CV and Articles: https://rub.academia.edu/VerenaKrebs
 Homepage (University of Bochum): https://www.ruhr-uni-bochum.de/realms/

References

1984 births
Living people
German historians
German medievalists
Fellows of the Royal Historical Society
Women medievalists
Historians of Christianity